Cychrus remondi is a species of ground beetle in the subfamily of Carabinae. It was described by Deuve in 1999.

References

remondi
Beetles described in 1999